Ismael Nery (October 9, 1900 – April 6, 1934) was a Brazilian artist.

Biography

Background 
Born in Belém, Pará, of Dutch, Native-Brazilian, and African ancestry, he studied at the Escola Nacional de Belas Artes (National School of Fine Arts) in Rio de Janeiro and at the Académie Julian in Paris. He created numerous paintings, wrote many poems and also helped design Brazil's National Patrimony of the Treasury department. Nery married a poet, Adalgisa Nery, in 1922. He contracted tuberculosis in 1931, and died of it in 1934. His iconic work is  Autorretrato, 1927 (Autorretrato Rio/Paris) , a surrealist painting commonly compared to the Green Violinist of Marc Chagall. Nowadays Autorretrato, 1927 (Autorretrato Rio/Paris) is exhibited by MASP.

Life 
Born in 1900, his family settled in 1909 in Rio de Janeiro. In 1915, he joined the National School of Fine Arts. He traveled to Europe in 1920, and attended the Académie Julian in Paris. Back in Brazil, he worked in the architecture section of the National Heritage service at the Ministry of Finance, where he became friends with the poet Murilo Mendes. In 1922, he married Adalgisa Ferreira. In this period, he produced works with an expressionist tendency.

His favorite themes are always linked to the human figure: portraits, self-portraits and nudes. He is not interested in national, indigenous and Afro-Brazilian themes. It diversifies the techniques used. He is also a scenographer . In 1929, he had two solo exhibitions, in Belém and Rio de Janeiro . The welcome disappoints him. He also participates in a group exhibition of Brazilian painting in New York.

Sickness and death 
That same year 1929, after a trip to Argentina and Uruguay, a diagnosis revealed that he was carrying tuberculosis, which forced him to live in a sanatorium for two years. He comes out apparently neat. He participated in a few shows, such as the Salão Revolucionário in Rio de Janeiro in 1931 and the Exposição de Arte Moderna da SPAM in São Paulo in 1933. But in 1933, the disease returned irreversibly. He died in 1934, at the age of thirty-three, in Rio de Janeiro, at a time when his notoriety beyond the circle of connoisseurs was still nascent. He is buried dressed in Franciscan, in a homage of the monks to his ardent Catholic faith.

Legacy 
In 1959, Adalgisa Nery published an autobiographical novel, A Imaginária , which became a bestseller. The book relates in particular the common years with Ismael Nery. Adalgisa Nery describes the fascination she initially felt for her husband, but also their agitated relationship, the internal torments of Ismael Nery, and her violence in everyday life.

Ismael Nery's work was forgotten by the public and critics until the 1960s, when his name was inscribed on the Biennale of São Paulo, In the room devoted to surrealism and fantastic art. His works were also exhibited in the 10th Biennale. In 1966 in Rio de Janeiro, and in 1984, at the Museum of Contemporary Art of the University of São Paulo (Ismael Nery Retrospective - 50 years later), two retrospectives of his creations were presented.

Gallery

Notes

Brazilian painters
Brazilian people of Dutch descent
Brazilian people of indigenous peoples descent
20th-century deaths from tuberculosis
Modern painters
Académie Julian alumni
1900 births
1934 deaths
20th-century Brazilian architects
Brazilian people of African descent
Tuberculosis deaths in Rio de Janeiro (state)